The jonquil parrot or olive-shouldered parrot (Aprosmictus jonquillaceus) is a species of parrot in the family Psittaculidae. It is found in forest, woodland and acacia savanna on the islands of Roti, Timor and Wetar. It is fairly common, but potentially threatened by habitat loss. Both sexes resemble the female of the closely related red-winged parrot.

References

External links
 Oriental Bird Images: Olive-shouldered Parrot  Selected photos

jonquil parrot
Birds of Timor
Birds of Wetar
Parrots of Asia
Near threatened animals
Near threatened biota of Asia
jonquil parrot
Taxa named by Louis Jean Pierre Vieillot
Taxonomy articles created by Polbot